The Ballad of Hugo Sánchez (or Club de Cuervos Presents: The Ballad of Hugo Sánchez) is a Mexican comedy-drama streaming television series that premiered on 17 June 2018 on Netflix. It is a spin-off based on Hugo Sánchez character from the Mexican series Club de Cuervos. The entire miniseries takes place within the first episode of season four of Club de Cuervos, which reuses several scenes from the miniseries.

Plot 
Hugo Sánchez (Jesús Zavala), who now, after being named Chava's personal assistant, will be in charge of taking the Cuervos to a tournament in Nicaragua called "Duelo de las Aves". For the first time, Hugo leaves his comfort zone to take charge of a team and his own life.

Cast 
 Jesús Zavala as Hugo Sánchez
 Pedro Miguel Arce as Panda
 Marcela Mar as Abril
 Luis Gerardo Méndez as Salvador "Chava" Iglesias
 Mariana Treviño as Isabel Iglesias
 Gianina Arana as Dalia

Episodes

Season 1 (2018)

References

External links
 

2018 Mexican television series debuts
2018 Mexican television series endings
Fictional association football television series
Mexican comedy television series
Spanish-language Netflix original programming
Television spin-offs